Polona Hercog was the defending champion but chose not to participate.

Elisabetta Cocciaretto won the title, defeating Viktoriya Tomova in the final, 7–6(7–5), 2–6, 7–5.

Seeds

Draw

Finals

Top half

Bottom half

References

Main Draw

Oeiras Ladies Open - Singles